Pennellidae is a family of parasitic copepods. When anchored on a host, they have a portion of the body on the outside of the host, whereas the remaining anterior part of the parasite is hidden inside tissues of the host.

Genera
There are 24 genera:

Allotrifur Yamaguti, 1963
Cardiodectes C. B. Wilson, 1917
Creopelates Shiino, 1958
Exopenna Boxshall, 1986
Haemobaphes Steenstrup & Lutken, 1861
Impexus Kabata, 1972
Lernaeenicus C. B. Wilson, 1932
Lernaeocera Blainville, 1822
Lernaeolophus Heller, 1865
Metapeniculus Castro-Romero & Baeza-Kurok, 1985
Nagasawanus Uyeno, 2015
Ophiolernaea Shiino, 1958
Parinia Kazachenko & Avdeev, 1977
Peniculisa C. B. Wilson, 1917
Peniculus von Nordmann, 1832
Pennella Oken, 1816
Peroderma Heller, 1865
Phrixocephalus C. B. Wilson, 1908
Propeniculus Castro Romero, 2014
Protosarcotretes Ohtsuka, Lindsay & Izawa, 2018 
Pseudopeniculus Castro Romero, 2014
Sarcotretes Jungersen, 1911
Serpentisaccus Blasiola, 1979
Trifur C. B. Wilson, 1917

References

Siphonostomatoida
Crustacean families
Taxa named by Hermann Burmeister